"Machines" is a song by the British-American synthpop duo Red Flag. It was released as a single in 1992.

Track listings
12" maxi-single
Catalog#: V-13863
Side A
 "Machines" (Metal Shop Mix)
 "Machines" (House of Sprockets Mix)
 "Machines" (LP Version)
 "Machines/Rhythmik Vibrations" (The Medley Mix)

Side AA
 "Machines" (Hammer and Saw Mix)
 "Machines" (Ambient Dub)
 "Machines" (Tekno Acid Dub)
 "Machines/Rhythmik Vibrations" (Tekno Vibrations Mix)

5" CD single
Catalog#: X25G-13863-2
 "Machines" (LP Edit) (4:28)
 "Machines" (Metal Shop Edit) (4:13)
 "Machines" (Tony's Edit) (4:18)
 "Machines"(Metal Shop Extended) (6:12)
 "Machines" (House of Sprockets Mix) (4:57)
 "Machines" (Hammer & Saw Mix) (6:10)
 "Rhythmik Vibrations" (5:07)
 "Tekno Vibrations" (4:02)

Chart position

"Machines (Limited Renditions)"

The single was re-released in 2000 containing all the tracks from the 1992 release with the addition of the track "Rescue" remixed by Razormaid! and originally available on Razormaid!: Level 1.  It was also included as disc V02.0 in the Megablack Box Set.

Track listing
Catalog#: 9 42002-2

 "Machines" (LP Edit) (4:28)
 "Machines" (Metal Shop Edit) (4:13)
 "Machines" (Tony's Edit) (4:18)
 "Machines"(Metal Shop Extended) (6:12)
 "Machines" (House of Sprockets Mix) (4:57)
 "Machines" (Hammer & Saw Mix) (6:10)
 "Rhythmik Vibrations" (5:07)
 "Tekno Vibrations" (4:02)
 "Rescue (Razormaid!)" (6:35)

References

1992 songs
1992 singles
2000 singles
Red Flag (band) songs
I.R.S. Records singles